John Teltschik (born March 8, 1964) is a former punter in the National Football League (NFL) who spent his entire career playing for the Philadelphia Eagles.  He led the NFL in punts in 1986, 1987, and 1988 and punting yards in 1986.

References

1964 births
Living people
People from Floresville, Texas
American football punters
Texas Longhorns football players
Philadelphia Eagles players